Scaevola chamissoniana is a shrub in the family Goodeniaceae and its native range is the Hawaiian Islands, where it is known as the Mountain naupaka or Naupaka kuahiwi.

it is found  in wet forests and open areas at elevations of about 1150 feet and  flowers all summer and throughout the year.

It was first described in 1829, by Charles Gaudichaud-Beaupré. The specific epithet, chamissoniana, honours Adelbert de Chamisso, naturalist to the expedition ("around the world, by order of the king").

References

Further reading
 pdf
 pdf

External links
Native Plants Hawaii: Scaevola chamissoniana

chamissoniana
Plants described in 1829
Taxa named by Charles Gaudichaud-Beaupré